Titanium disilicide (TiSi2) is an inorganic chemical compound of titanium and silicon.

Preparation 
Titanium disilicide can be obtained from the reaction between titanium or titanium hydride with silicon.

Ti + 2 Si → TiSi2
It is also possible to prepare it aluminothermically by the ignition of aluminium powder, sulfur, silicon dioxide, and titanium dioxide or potassium hexafluorotitanate, K2TiF6, by electrolysis of a melt of potassium hexafluorotitanate and titanium dioxide, or by reaction of titanium with silicon tetrachloride.

Another method is the reaction of titanium tetrachloride with silane, dichlorosilane or silicon.

TiCl4 + 2 SiH4 → TiSi2 + 4 HCl + 2 H2
TiCl4 + 2 SiH2Cl2 + 2 H2 → TiSi2 + 8 HCl
TiCl4 + 3 Si → TiSi2 + SiCl4

Uses 
Titanium silicide is used in the semiconductor industry. It is typically grown by means of salicide technology over silicon and polysilicon lines to reduce the sheet resistance of local transistors connections.
In the microelectronic industry it is typically used in the C54 phase.

References

Transition metal silicides
Titanium(II) compounds